Patrick Baur and Udo Riglewski were the defending champions, but none competed this year.

Per Henricsson and Nicklas Utgren won the title by defeating Josef Čihák and Karel Nováček 7–5, 6–2 in the final.

Seeds

Draw

Draw

References

External links
 Official results archive (ATP)
 Official results archive (ITF)

Men's Doubles
Doubles